This is a list of objects that are allegedly cursed.

Objects

A 
The Anguished Man
 Annabelle (doll)

B 
Busby's stoop chair
Black Prince's Ruby

C 
The Crying Boy
 The Conjured Chest

D 
Dybbuk box

G

H 
The Hands Resist Him
Hope Diamond

J 
 James Dean's Little Bastard

K 
 koh-i-noor diamond

L 
 The Woman from Lemb Statue

M 
 Maori Warrior Masks

O 
Ötzi

P
Several paintings

R 
Robert (doll)

T 
Terracotta Army
Tomb of Tutankhamun
tallman family bunks

See also 

 List of haunted paintings

References 

Cursed objects